Alvin Dewayne Bailey (born August 26, 1991) is a former American football guard. He played college football at Arkansas. He was signed by the Seattle Seahawks as an undrafted free agent in 2013.

High school career
A native of Broken Arrow, Oklahoma, Bailey attended Broken Arrow Senior High School, where he anchored the offensive line for three straight season and was regarded a three-star recruit by Rivals.com. He accepted a scholarship offer from Arkansas over offers from Nebraska and Kansas State.

College career
After redshirting in 2009, he started all 13 games for the Razorbacks as Arkansas was the only school in the SEC to start the same offensive line every game in 2010. In his redshirt sophomore season at Arkansas, Bailey was a Second-team All-SEC selection. As a redshirt junior, he started in all 12 games.

In December 2012, Bailey announced his decision to forgo his final year of eligibility, entering the 2013 NFL Draft. He signed with Morgan Advisory Group, and began his preparations for the NFL Combine workouts in Arizona.

Professional career

Although being projected as a third-/fourth-round pick, Bailey was not selected in the 2013 NFL Draft.

Seattle Seahawks
Bailey played for the Seattle Seahawks from 2013 to 2015. During his time with the Seahawks, the team won Super Bowl XLVIII and made an appearance in Super Bowl XLIX.

Cleveland Browns
Bailey signed with the Cleveland Browns on March 11, 2016. Bailey was suspended two games on December 15, 2016, as a result of a driving under the influence arrest in September 

On April 20, 2017, Bailey was released by the Browns.

References

External links

Seattle Seahawks bio 
Arkansas Razorbacks bio

1991 births
Living people
People from Broken Arrow, Oklahoma
African-American players of American football
American football offensive guards
Arkansas Razorbacks football players
Players of American football from Oklahoma
Seattle Seahawks players
Cleveland Browns players
21st-century African-American sportspeople